New Zealand political leader Jim McLay assembled a "shadow cabinet" system amongst the National caucus following his election to the position of Leader of the Opposition in 1984. He composed this of individuals who acted for the party as spokespeople in assigned roles while he was Leader of the Opposition (1984–86). McLay was plagued by interference from previous leader Robert Muldoon, who was denied a place on National's frontbench which he desired, unlike McLay who wished him to retire to the backbenches as an 'elder statesmen'.

As the National Party formed the largest party not in government at the time, the frontbench team was as a result the Official Opposition of the New Zealand House of Representatives.

List of shadow ministers

Frontbench teams
The list below contains a list of McLays's shadow ministers and their respective roles. McLay initially retained the lineup he inherited from previous leader Sir Robert Muldoon when he became leader in November 1984. The only changes made were Muldoon relinquishing the Finance portfolio which was given to John Falloon.

January 1985
McLay announced his first shadow cabinet in January 1985.

August 1985
McLay reshuffled his shadow cabinet in August 1985 to accommodate Maurice McTigue, after he won the Timaru by-election, and reflect Rob Talbot who had requested not to have a portfolio as he intended to retire at the next election.

February 1986
McLay announced a major reshuffle in February 1986. He demoted Muldoon and Merv Wellington to the lowest and third lowest rankings for disloyalty and also promoted several MPs to the frontbench at the expense of Bill Birch and George Gair, which would cause destabilization in the caucus.

Notes

References

New Zealand National Party
McLay, Jim
1984 in New Zealand
1984 establishments in New Zealand
1986 disestablishments in New Zealand